Malacca Sultanate Palace Museum is a museum located in Malacca City, Malacca, Malaysia. The building is a modern reconstruction of the palace of the Malacca Sultanate, based on the information and data obtained from the Malay Annals. It is made up of hardwood (for its structure), 'belian' wood (for its roof) and wooden pegs (instead of nails) and was constructed in 1984 and became a cultural museum which showcases the history of the region. The museum was officially opened on 17 July 1986 by Prime Minister Mahathir Mohamad.

See also
 List of museums in Malaysia
 List of tourist attractions in Malacca

References

Literature

External links 

 Virtual Museum Melaka | Malacca Sultanate Palace Museum

1986 establishments in Malaysia
Buildings and structures in Malacca City
Museums established in 1986
Museums in Malacca